The Whole Thing Started with Rock and Roll Now It's Out of Control is the second studio album by American singer and keyboardist Ray Manzarek. Released on the Mercury label in 1974 the album did not succeed and failed in sales, it was also Ray's last album before forming the now defunct rock band Nite City in 1977.

Track listing 
All tracks composed by Ray Manzarek unless noted otherwise.
"The Whole Thing Started with Rock and Roll Now It's Out of Control" (Manzarek, Danny Sugerman, Dick Wagner) – 2:39
"The Gambler" (Manzarek, Danny Sugerman) – 5:23
"Whirling Dervish" (Manzarek, Paul Davis) – 5:20
"Begin the World Again" – 6:42
"I Wake Up Screaming" (Manzarek, Danny Sugerman, Jim Morrison) – 3:36
"Art Deco Fandango" – 2:03
"Bicentennial Blues (Love It or Leave It)" – 7:57
"Perfumed Garden" – 5:54

Poem on "I Wake Up Screaming" from The New Creatures by Jim Morrison

Personnel
Ray Manzarek – celesta, clavinet, Fender Rhodes, organ, piano, Wurlitzer, synthesizer, vocals
Joe Walsh – guitar
Michael Fennelly – guitar
Mark Pines – guitar
George Segal – banjo
Gary Mallaber – drums, percussion, vibraphone
Paul Davis – percussion
Steve Forman – percussion
Patti Smith – "poetess" on "I Wake up Screaming"; recites Jim Morrison's "Ensenada" from The New Creatures
Flo & Eddie – background vocals on "The Whole Thing Started with Rock and Roll Now It's Out of Control" , "Bicentennial Blues" and "Perfumed Garden"
John Klemmer – saxophone on "Whirling Dervish"
Mike Melvoin – horn arrangements
Technical
Rudy Hill – engineer
Desmond Strobel, John David Moore – art direction
James Fortune, Keith Rodabaugh – photography
Danny Sugerman – personal management

Special thanks: "Guitar Center, the Screamer, Linda Smith, Iggy Pop, Mandi Newall."

References 

1975 albums
Albums produced by Bruce Botnick
Ray Manzarek albums
Mercury Records albums